The 2004 Ontario Scott Tournament of Hearts was held January 27-February 1 at the Copper Cliff Curling Club in Copper Cliff, Ontario.  The Sherry Middaugh rink from Coldwater, Ontario won their third Ontario provincial title.

Teams

Standings

Tie breaker
Rizzo 8-3 Cadorin

Playoffs

External links
Official Site

Ontario Scotties Tournament of Hearts
2004 in Canadian curling
Curling in Northern Ontario
2004 in Ontario
January 2004 sports events in Canada
February 2004 sports events in Canada